The Commonwealth Scientific and Industrial Research Organisation (CSIRO)'s radio astronomy observatories are collectively known as the Australia Telescope National Facility (ATNF), with the facility supporting Australia's research in radio astronomy. It is part of CSIRO's business unit known as CSIRO Space and Astronomy..

CSIRO currently operates four observatories as part of the ATNF. Three are in New South Wales near the towns of Parkes, Coonabarabran and Narrabri.The fourth telescope, the next generation Australian Square Kilometre Array Pathfinder (ASKAP) is located at the Murchison Radio-astronomy Observatory in Western Australia. These telescopes can be used together as a long baseline array for use in Very Long Baseline Interferometry.

Radio telescopes included in the ATNF:
 The Australia Telescope Compact Array
 The Parkes Observatory
 The Mopra Observatory
 The Australian Square Kilometre Array Pathfinder

See also

 Australian Space Agency
 List of radio telescopes

References

External links
ATNF Webpage
CSIRO Webpage
CSIRO Astronomy and Space Science
Visiting the Parkes radio telescope

Astronomical observatories in New South Wales
Space programme of Australia
CSIRO